Unione Sportiva Calcio Colognese is an Italian association football club located in Cologno al Serio, Lombardy. It currently plays in Eccellenza.

History 
The club was founded in 1961.

In the season 2011–12 it was relegated to Eccellenza.

Colors and badge 
Its colors are yellow and green.

Honours
 Coppa Italia Dilettanti
 Winners: 2004–05

References

External links
Official homepage

Football clubs in Italy
Football clubs in Lombardy
Association football clubs established in 1964
Italian football clubs established in 1964